Episterol is a sterol involved in the biosynthesis of steroids. Episterol is converted from 24-methylenelophenol. Episterol is converted to 5-dehydroepisterol by ERG3, the C-5 sterol desaturase in the yeast. Episterol is also known to be a precursor to ergosterol.

References

External links
PubChem

Sterols